The Wenatchee–East Wenatchee Metropolitan Statistical Area, as defined by the United States Census Bureau, is an area consisting of Chelan and Douglas Counties in Washington state, anchored by the cities of Wenatchee and East Wenatchee. According to the 2000 census the MSA had a population of 99,219.  The 2010 census showed the MSA had a population increase of 11.76% to 110,884. As of 2015, the Wenatchee Metropolitan Statistical Area was the 331st largest MSA in the United States.

Counties
Chelan
Douglas

Communities
Places with more than 25,000 inhabitants
Wenatchee (Principal city)
Places with 10,000 to 25,000 inhabitants
East Wenatchee Bench (census-designated place)
Places with 1,000 to 10,000 inhabitants
Bridgeport
Cashmere 
Chelan 
Coulee Dam (partial)
East Wenatchee (Principal city)
Leavenworth
South Wenatchee (census-designated place)
Sunnyslope (census-designated place)
Waterville
Places with less than 1,000 inhabitants
Entiat 
Mansfield
Rock Island
Unincorporated places
Blewett
Holden Village
Manson
Stehekin
Orondo

Demographics
As of the census of 2000, there were 99,219 people, 36,747 households, and 26,240 families residing within the MSA. The racial makeup of the MSA was 83.97% White, 0.28% African American, 1.02% Native American, 0.63% Asian, 0.11% Pacific Islander, 11.74% from other races, and 2.25% from two or more races. Hispanic or Latino of any race were 19.42% of the population.

The median income for a household in the MSA was $37,890, and the median income for a family was $45,035. Males had a median income of $35,491 versus $25,316 for females. The per capita income for the MSA was $18,211.

See also
Washington census statistical areas

References

 
Metropolitan areas of Washington (state)